Week Green is a hamlet in north Cornwall, England, United Kingdom. It is south of and near to Week St Mary.

References

Hamlets in Cornwall